Visa requirements for South Korean citizens are administrative entry restrictions by the authorities of other states placed on citizens of South Korea.

As of 19 July 2022, South Korean citizens had visa-free or visa on arrival access to 192 countries and territories, ranking the South Korean passport 2nd in the world (tied with Singaporean passport) according to the Henley Passport Index.
As of 2018, the passports of South Korea, Brunei and Chile are the only ones to provide visa-free access to all G8 countries. As of 2020, the passports of South Korea, Israel, Hong Kong and Chile are the only ones to provide visa free access to all European countries.''

Visa requirements map

Visa requirements
Visa requirements for holders of normal passports travelling for tourist purposes:

Territories and disputed areas
    Visa requirements for South Korean citizens for visits to various territories, disputed areas, partially recognized countries and restricted zones:

Access-restricted countries

, the South Korean government, due to safety concerns, has banned its citizens and permanent residents from visiting Afghanistan, Iraq, Somalia, Syria, Libya and Yemen. Also, South Korean citizens are basically not allowed to visit North Korea except when special authorizations are granted by the Ministry of Unification on a limited basis (e.g. workers and businessmen visiting or commuting to/from Kaesong Industrial Complex). Yet eight people on six occasions, from Lim Su-kyung in 1989 to Ro Su-hui in 2012, have visited one or more banned countries unapproved and returned to South Korea via Panmunjom were sentenced to imprisonment of up to 10 years.

APEC Business Travel Card

Holders of an APEC Business Travel Card (ABTC)  travelling on business do not require a visa to the following countries:

1 – up to 90 days
2 – up to 60 days
3 – up to 59 days

The card must be used in conjunction with a passport and has the following advantages:
undertake legitimate business in participating economies
expedited border crossing in all member economies, including transitional members
expedited scheduling of visa interview (United States)

Non-visa restrictions

Consular protection abroad

There are no South Korean embassies in North Korea and vice versa.

See also

 List of nationalities forbidden at border
 Republic of Korea passport
 Visa policy of South Korea

References and notes

Notes

References 

Foreign relations of South Korea
Korea, South